Marian Duś (25 June 1938 – 9 September 2021) was a Polish Roman Catholic Bishop, Doctor of Philosophy in the field of social sciences, Auxiliary Bishop of Warsaw in the years 
1986–2013, and since 2013 an Auxiliary Bishop Emeritus of the Roman Catholic Archdiocese of Warsaw.

References

1938 births
2021 deaths
People from Dębica County
Bishops of Warsaw
20th-century Roman Catholic bishops in Poland
21st-century Roman Catholic bishops in Poland
John Paul II Catholic University of Lublin alumni